International Socialism is a British-based quarterly journal established in 1960 and published in London by the Socialist Workers Party which discusses socialist theory. It is currently edited by Joseph Choonara who replaced Alex Callinicos, who took over for ten years in November 2009 after Chris Harman died.

The current journal is the second series following an earlier series which ran from 1960 to 1978 publishing a total of 104 issues. Originally edited by Michael Kidron for its first five years, with Alasdair MacIntyre co-editing it alongside him for 18 months, subsequently the first series was variously edited by Nigel Harris, Chris Harman, Duncan Hallas and Alex Callinicos. The second series was originally edited by Peter Binns, who was succeeded as editor by John Rees. Previously, a single issue of a duplicated journal of this name had been published in 1958 and the first edition of Tony Cliff's essay on Rosa Luxemburg was published, in book form, as issue 2/3 in series with this otherwise one-off publication.

References

External links 
 
The Journal International Socialism by Alex Callinicos, International Critical Thought, 5, 2 (2015)
 Socialist Review and International Socialism Journal Index. Includes text of issues from 2:61 (Winter 1993) to 2:104 (Autumn 2004), after which the text is available on the journal website.
International Socialism Journal Index 1958–1968
ISJ Index 1969–1974
ISJ Index 1975–1978
ISJ Index 1978–1991
ISJ Index 1991–2003
ISJ Index 2003–2016

1958 establishments in England
Political magazines published in the United Kingdom
Quarterly magazines published in the United Kingdom
Communist magazines
Magazines established in 1958
Socialist Workers Party (UK)
Trotskyist works